Yunus Nüzhet Unat (4 August 1913 – 27 July 1999) was a Turkish cyclist. He competed in the team pursuit event at the 1928 Summer Olympics.

References

External links
 

1913 births
1999 deaths
Turkish male cyclists
Olympic cyclists of Turkey
Cyclists at the 1928 Summer Olympics
Place of birth missing
20th-century Turkish people